NGC 135 is a lenticular galaxy located in the constellation of Cetus and 335 million light-years away, and 40,000 light-years across.

History 
NGC 135 was discovered on October 2, 1886 by Francis Leavenworth (and was later listed as NGC 135), but when Stéphane Javelle rediscovered it on November 4, 1891, it was thought to be another object, and so it was called IC 26. Finally, in 1900, Herbert Alonzo Howe made the connection between the two objects as one. (The cause for this is that Leavenworth made an incorrect measurement.)

References 

Lenticular galaxies
Astronomical objects discovered in 1886
IC objects
0135
002010
Cetus (constellation)